Xiphactinus (from Latin and Greek for "sword-ray") is an extinct genus of large predatory marine bony fish that lived during the Late Cretaceous (Albian to Maastrichtian). Species in the genus bore a superficial resemblance to a gargantuan, fanged tarpon.

The species Portheus molossus described by Cope is a junior synonym of X. audax. Skeletal remains of Xiphactinus have come from the Carlile Shale and Greenhorn Limestone of Kansas (where the first Xiphactinus fossil was discovered during the 1850s in the Niobrara Chalk), and Cretaceous formations all over the East Coast (most notably Georgia, Alabama, North Carolina, and New Jersey) in the United States, as well as Europe, Australia, the Kanguk and Ashville Formations of Canada, La Luna Formation of Venezuela and the Salamanca Formation in Argentina.

Paleobiology 

Species of Xiphactinus were voracious predatory fish. At least a dozen specimens of X. audax have been collected with the remains of large, undigested or partially digested prey in their stomachs. The larger fish apparently died soon after eating its prey, most likely owing to the smaller prey's struggling and rupturing an organ as it was being swallowed. This fossil is on display at the Sternberg Museum of Natural History in Hays, Kansas.

Like many other species in the Late Cretaceous oceans, a dead or injured individual was likely to be scavenged by sharks (Cretoxyrhina and Squalicorax). The remains of a Xiphactinus were found within a large specimen of Cretoxyrhina collected by Charles H. Sternberg. The specimen is on display at the University of Kansas Museum of Natural History.

Virtually nothing is known about the larval or juvenile stages.

The species and all other ichthyodectids became extinct near the end of the Late Cretaceous – see Cretaceous–Paleogene extinction event.

An incomplete skull of what may be a new species of Xiphactinus was found in 2002 in the Czech Republic, in a small town called Šachov next to Borohrádek city, by then 16-year-old student Michal Matějka.

In July 2010 the bones of a Xiphactinus were discovered near Morden, Manitoba, Canada.

"Unicerosaurus" 
In 1982, a former Baptist minister, Carl Baugh, began excavations on the limestone beds of the Paluxy River, near Glen Rose, Texas, famous for its dinosaur tracks. Some of the tracks resembled human footprints and had been proclaimed since 1900 as evidence that dinosaurs and modern humans had once lived alongside one another. Scientists' investigations found the supposed human footprints to be "forms of elongate dinosaur tracks, while others were selectively highlighted erosional markings, and still others (on loose blocks) probable carvings." While excavating, he found a solitary "Y-shaped" fossil that he informally called "Unicerosaurus". In a 1987 popular article, John Armstrong described the fossil as a "Y-shaped petrified bone that appears to be the neural spine from a huge fish like the Portheus of Niobrara Chalk" that Baugh's museum "declared to be the forehead horn of a newly discovered dinosaur genus". The museum's exhibit told visitors that the "horn" belonged to "the unicorn of Job 38, one of three dinosaurs mentioned in Scripture; the others being behemoth and leviathan of Job 40 and 41", and that the horn was able to fold back like the blade of a jack knife. Although some Young Earth Creationists shared Baugh's interpretations of the biblical Behemoth and Leviathan, Baugh's claims were not taken seriously either by Christian organizations or the scientific community.

In popular culture 

In October 2010, Kansas House Rep. Tom Sloan (R-Lawrence) announced that he would introduce legislation to make Xiphactinus audax, a.k.a. the "X-fish", the state fossil of Kansas.

Notes

References

External links 

 Carnegie Museum
 Oceans of Kansas
 a painting and information
 BBC
 Canadian Fossil Discovery Centre

Ichthyodectidae
Marine fish genera
Prehistoric ray-finned fish genera
Late Cretaceous fish of North America
Cretaceous Canada
Fossils of Canada
Cretaceous United States
Fossils of the United States
Cretaceous fish of Europe
Prehistoric fish of Australia
Prehistoric fish of South America
Cretaceous Venezuela
Fossils of Venezuela
Albian genus first appearances
Cenomanian genera
Turonian genera
Coniacian genera
Santonian genera
Campanian genera
Maastrichtian genus extinctions
Demopolis Chalk
Mooreville Chalk
Fossil taxa described in 1870
Taxa named by Joseph Leidy
Cretaceous Argentina
Golfo San Jorge Basin
Salamanca Formation